Tsaangi (Tsangui) is a Bantu language spoken in Gabon and the Republic of Congo.

References

Languages of Gabon
Nzebi languages
Languages of the Republic of the Congo